Martha Speaks is a children's picture book written and illustrated by Susan Meddaugh, published by Houghton Mifflin in 1992. It is the first in a series of six books featuring a young girl's pet dog named Martha.

Plot
The book follows the adventures of the dog Martha, who could speak after being fed alphabet soup. The family complains about Martha being talkative, and she stops eating her soup. Then, when a burglar breaks into her house, Martha was unable to call for help. When the burglar gives her alphabet soup, Martha calls the police and the family appreciates her for speaking again.

Reception

The Horn Book Magazine said the book was "Good-natured and amusing, with cheerful illustrations" and Patricia Tauzer writing for Common Sense Media wrote in a four star (out of five) review that, "the story is clever."

In popular culture
Prior to an adaptation into a TV series of the same name in 2008, the book was featured on an episode of Reading Rainbow, and was also featured (but not read) on an episode of Kino's Storytime.

References

1992 children's books
American picture books
Books about dogs
Talking animals in fiction
Houghton Mifflin books